The black-throated toucanet (Aulacorhynchus atrogularis) is a near-passerine bird in the toucan family Ramphastidae. It is found in Bolivia, Brazil, Ecuador, and Peru.

Taxonomy and systematics

The black-throated toucanet was originally described in the genus Pteroglossus. What is now the black-throated toucanet was three of many subspecies of the then emerald toucanet (Aulacorhynchus prasinus sensu lato). In 2008 the International Ornithological Committee (IOC) split 10 of those subspecies to create seven new species, one of which is the black-throated toucanet, and retained four of them as subspecies of their current emerald toucanet sensu stricto. BirdLife International's Handbook of the Birds of the World (HBW) concurred. However, the North and South American Classification Committees of the American Ornithological Society and the Clements taxonomy declined to follow them. In 2017 they did split the emerald toucanet into two species, the northern (A. prasinus) and southern (A. albivitta) emerald-toucanets, each with seven subspecies. They treat the IOC's "black-throated" as three subspecies of the southern emerald-toucanet.

Three subspecies of black-throated toucanet are recognized by the IOC and HBW:

 "Black-billed toucanet" (A. a. cyanolaemus) - Gould, 1866
 A. a. dimidiatus - Ridgway, 1886
 The nominate A. a. atrogularis - (Sturm, J.H.C.F. & Sturm, J.W., 1841)

Description

Like other toucans, the black-throated toucanet is brightly marked and has a large bill. The sexes are alike in appearance although the female generally is smaller and shorter-billed. The bills of A. a. dimidiatus and A. a. atrogularis are black a wide yellow stripe along the culmen; that of A. a. cyanolaemus is black with the only yellow on the tip of the maxilla. The bills of all three have a white vertical strip at the base. All three subspecies have plumage that is mainly green like that of other members of genus Aulacorhynchus, and is somewhat lighter below than above. Subpecies A. a. dimidiatus and A. a. atrogularis have black throats and A. a. cyanolaemus a blue throat. All subspecies have olive green legs and feet with dusky yellow soles.

Distribution and habitat

The three subspecies of white-throated toucanet are found thus:

 A. a. cyanolaemus, the eastern slope of the Andes of southeastern Ecuador and northern Peru
 A. a. dimidiatus, the Andean foothills and western Amazonia of eastern Peru, western Brazil, and northern Bolivia
 A. a. atrogularis, the eastern slope of the Andes from central Peru to central Bolivia

The black-throated toucanet primarily inhabits the interior of humid montane forest but is also found in more open landscapes like the forest's edge, secondary forest, plantations, and clearings with scattered trees. In Amazonia it is also found in lowland evergreen forest.

Behavior

Movement

The black-throated toucanet is non-migratory.

Social behavior

The black-throated toucanet is gregarious and frequently gathers in small groups.

Feeding

The black-throated toucanet forages by gleaning in the middle to upper levels of the forest, usually while perched. Its diet is eclectic and includes a wide variety of fruits, terrestrial invertebrates, and small vertebrate prey.

Breeding

Little is known about the black-throated toucanet's breeding biology. Its nesting season in Peru is from May to September. It nests in a tree cavity like others of its family.

Vocal and non-vocal sounds

The black-throated toucanet's vocalization in Peru is described as "a long series of grinding grunts grra grra grra...or barking yaps yak yak yak yak yak." In flight its wings make a whirring sound.

Status

The IUCN has assessed the black-throated toucanet as being of Least Concern. It has a large range, but its population size is not known and is believed to be decreasing. No immediate threats have been identified. It is "vulnerable to habitat destruction".

References

Aulacorhynchus
Birds described in 1841